The Saint-Cyr River  is a tributary of the eastern shore of the Ottawa River. The Saint-Cyr River flows into the Municipality Rapides-des-Joachims, then from Sheenboro into the Regional County Municipality (MRC) Pontiac Regional County Municipality, in Outaouais administrative region, in Quebec, in Canada.

Geography

Toponymy
The former name of the river was "Boom West Brook", as opposed to the branch being referred to as "Boom Creek" in this hydrographic slope.

The toponym "Saint-Cyr River" was formalized on December 5, 1968, at the Commission de toponymie du Québec.

Sources

External links 
Pontiac Tourism
CLD Pontiac

See also 

Rivers of Outaouais
Pontiac Regional County Municipality